General Sir James Edward Alexander  (16 October 1803 – 2 April 1885) was a Scottish traveller, author and soldier in the British Army.

Alexander was the driving force behind the placement of Cleopatra's Needle on the Thames Embankment.

Background
Born in Stirling, he was the eldest son of Edward Alexander of Powis, Clackmannanshire, and his second wife Catherine Glas, daughter of John Glas, Provost of Stirling. 

The family purchased Powis House near Stirling in 1808 from James Mayne (his uncle by marriage) for £26,500. His father, a banker, had to sell Powis House in 1827 on collapse of the Stirling Banking Company. He received his training in Edinburgh, Glasgow, and the Royal Military College, Sandhurst.

In 1837, he married Eveline Marie Mitchell, daughter of Col C. C. Mitchell of the Royal Artillery.

In 1853, he obtained Westerton House in Bridge of Allan, built in 1803 by Dr John Henderson of the East India Company (a cousin and friend). Here he became an elder of Logie Kirk, walking there each Sunday.

He died in Ryde on the Isle of Wight but is buried in Old Logie Churchyard just east of his home town of Stirling. The graveyard lies several hundred metres north of Logie Cemetery and the 19th century Logie Kirk.

After his death, his trustees sold Westerton House to Edmund Pullar.

Military career
In 1820, he joined the British East India Company's army, transferring into the British Army in 1825. As aide-de-camp to the British envoy to Persia, he witnessed fighting during the war between Persia and Russia in 1826 and in 1829 was present in the Balkans during the Russo-Turkish War, 1828-1829. 

From 1832 to 1834, he witnessed the War of the Two Brothers in Portugal, and in 1835 he took part in the 6th Cape Frontier War in South Africa as aide-de-camp and private secretary to Sir Benjamin d'Urban. He was the son-in-law of Charles Collier Michell, having married, in Cape Town on 25 October 1837, Eveline Marie Mitchell (born 16 April 1821).

In 1838, he was made a Knight Bachelor for his services. From 1841, he served in Canada, among others in the staff of Sir William Rowan. During the Crimean War, he commanded the 14th Regiment of Foot as lieutenant-colonel in the Siege of Sevastopol in 1855 and held an important command during the New Zealand Wars in New Zealand in 1862. He retired from active service in 1877 and on 1 July 1881 was given the honorary rank of general.

Explorer

On behalf of the Royal Geographical Society (which he had co-founded), he conducted an exploring expedition into Namaqualand and Damaraland, lasting from 8 September 1836 to 21 September 1837, in the course of which he collected rock specimens, pelts of rare animals, birdskins, weapons and implements from the Herero and Nama, as well as drawing maps of the region and making a first list of Herero words. 

Subsequently, Arrowsmith made use of his data to draw a map accompanying his book of the expedition. Alexander Bay on the Orange River mouth, is named after him. 

In 1877, he was largely responsible for the preservation and transfer of Cleopatra's Needle to England.

Works
 Travels from India to England: comprehending a visit to the Burman empire, and a journey through Persia, Asia Minor, European Turkey, &c. In the years 1825-26. – London : Parbury, Allen, & Co, 1827
 Travels through Russia and the Crimea. (1830, 2 vols.)
 Transatlantic Sketches: comprising visits to the most Interesting Scenes in North & South America & West Indies. 2 vols. – London : Richard Bentley, 1833
 Sketches in Portugal during the Civil War of 1834. – London : J. Cochrane & Co, 1835
 Narrative of a Voyage of Observation among the Colonies of Western Africa, in the Flag-Ship Thalia; and of a Campaign in Kaffir-Land, on the Staff of the Commander-in-Chief in 1835. 2 vols. – London : Henry Colburn, 1837
 Expedition of discovery into the interior of Africa : Through the Hitherto Undescribed Countries of the Great Namaquas, Boschmans, and Hill Damaras, Performed under the Auspices of Her Majesty's Government and the Royal Geographic Society. 2 vols. – London : Henry Colburn, 1838
 Life of Field Marshal, His Grace the Duke of Wellington : Embracing His Civil, Military, and Political Career to the Present Time. 2 vols. – London : Henry Colbourn, 1839–40
 L'Acadie : or Seven Years' Explorations in British America. 2 vols. – London : Henry Colburn, 1849 (online: vol.1, vol.2)
 Passages in the life of a soldier, or, Military service in the East and West. – London : Hurst & Blackett, 1857
 Salmon-Fishing in Canada by a Resident. – London und Montreal : Longman, Green, Longman, and Roberts, 1860
 Incidents of the last Maori-War in New Zealand. – London : Richard Bentley, 1863
 The Albatross : record of voyage of the "Great Britain" steam ship from Victoria to England in 1862. – Stirling : C. Rogers & Co., 1863
 Bush Fighting. – London : Sampson, Low, Marston, Low & Searle, 1873
 Cleopatra's Needle, the obelisk of Alexandria (1879)

References

 

1803 births
1885 deaths
British Army personnel of the Crimean War
British East India Company Army officers
British military personnel of the New Zealand Wars
Knights Bachelor
Knights of the Order of St John
West Yorkshire Regiment officers
Graduates of the Royal Military College, Sandhurst
Scottish soldiers
Scottish explorers
Scottish knights
Military personnel from Stirling
Scottish people of the British Empire
Scottish travel writers
Scottish geographers
Fellows of the Royal Society of Edinburgh
Fellows of the Royal Geographical Society
British East India Company Army soldiers
Companions of the Order of the Bath
History of Namibia
James Edward